In motor racing, team orders is the practice of teams issuing instructions to drivers to deviate from the normal practice of racing against each other as they would against other teams' drivers. This can be accomplished either in advance, simply by establishing a pecking order between the drivers within the team, or by instructing a driver to let their teammate overtake or to hold position without the risk of collision.

This is generally done when one driver is behind in a particular race but ahead overall in a championship season. The team will then order their drivers to rearrange themselves on the track so as to give more championship points to a driver who is ahead in the championship. Team orders may also be given when multiple drivers are in a position far ahead of the field, being all but assured of the win. Team orders are issued to prevent drivers from racing each other, so that they conserve fuel, reduce the likelihood of mechanical failure, and avoid a collision. Such orders have been made on countless occasions in the history of motorsport, sometimes causing great acrimony between the team and the disadvantaged driver, and controversy in the media.

Team orders in Formula One

Early examples
Such orders were legal and accepted historically in motor racing.  In the early years of the Formula One World Championship, it was even legal for a driver to give up his car during the race to the team leader if the latter's car had broken down.  In 1955, the Mercedes team asked Juan Manuel Fangio to let his teammate Stirling Moss win his home Grand Prix at Aintree. Fangio obliged, refusing to attack Moss in the closing stages of the race, and came home in second place, less than a second behind Moss.

The 1964 season saw a dramatic finale in which Lorenzo Bandini moved over for John Surtees during the Mexican Grand Prix, allowing Surtees to get the necessary points to beat Graham Hill to the World Championship.

In the 1979 German Grand Prix Clay Regazzoni was instructed by the Williams pits not to attack his teammate Alan Jones for the lead, despite Regazzoni being ahead in the championship. The status of Jones as number one driver at Williams lasted until 1981, when Carlos Reutemann deliberately ignored team orders at the 1981 Brazilian Grand Prix and did not allow him to pass. This resulted in a long feud between the two that eventually led to Jones' retirement at the end of the season, with Reutemann missing out on the World Championship for one single point.

At the 1982 French Grand Prix, René Arnoux enraged Renault by refusing to give way to his teammate Alain Prost, who at the time was ahead in the championship. However, those three points had no impact, as Prost finished fourth in the championship that year, ten points behind eventual champion Keke Rosberg.

During the 1983 South African Grand Prix, the Brabham-BMW team asked driver Riccardo Patrese to cede Nelson Piquet the race win if it ensured Piquet would win the driver's championship. However, this did not prove to be necessary as Patrese won the race while Piquet came third, enough to secure him the championship.

At the 1991 Japanese Grand Prix, Ayrton Senna, who had already secured the championship title that year, conceded the race win to Gerhard Berger, saying after the race that he had done so because "he had been very helpful".

Riccardo Patrese found himself in a similar situation to what he did in 1983 again in 1992, when he waved his Williams teammate Nigel Mansell through during the 1992 French Grand Prix, which Mansell went on to win ahead of Patrese in second.

Negative media reception
In the late 1990s, incidents of team orders began to be reported more prominently by the media, and public reaction to the more blatant examples became extremely negative. At the 1997 European Grand Prix, Jacques Villeneuve, already with the title in the bag (after the controversial collision with Schumacher, which Villeneuve's Williams survived), was asked by his engineer via radio to let the McLaren cars pass as "They've been very helpful", while at the 1998 Australian Grand Prix, the McLaren drivers David Coulthard and Mika Häkkinen caused a stir by switching position at the end of the race in order to respect a previous agreement.

In contrast to prior examples, the 1997 Japanese Grand Prix saw a more sophisticated use of team orders, where Ferrari driver Eddie Irvine began the race light on fuel, allowing him to get ahead of the superior Williams-Renault cars and hold them up, to the benefit of teammate Michael Schumacher.

At the 1998 Belgian Grand Prix, the two Jordans of Damon Hill and Ralf Schumacher found themselves unexpectedly in the lead after a collision between Michael Schumacher and David Coulthard. Ralf was subsequently ordered not to overtake Hill, to assure Jordan of a 1-2 finish.

At the 1999 German Grand Prix, Mika Salo, driving for Ferrari in place of the injured Michael Schumacher, was leading the race when he was told to allow teammate Eddie Irvine to pass. Salo complied, giving up what would have been his only Formula One victory in 109 career races. Irvine ultimately failed to win the championship that year, losing out to Mika Häkkinen.

At the 2002 Austrian Grand Prix, Rubens Barrichello was ordered to allow Ferrari teammate Michael Schumacher to pass to obtain the win. This received huge amounts of negative attention from the media, as the order was issued shortly before both drivers crossed the finish line. Both drivers were unhappy about the situation. Schumacher refused to take the top step of the podium and the centre seat, normally reserved to the winner, during the post-race press conference, and the team was punished for breach of podium procedure. At the United States Grand Prix the same year, Schumacher appeared to have returned the favour by giving Barrichello the win by the record smallest margin of 0.011 seconds on the finishing line, though it is assumed Schumacher was trying to trigger a dead-heat finish.

Team orders ban
After the 2002 season, FIA announced that "Team Orders that could influence the outcome of a race" were banned, although they were sometimes still implemented discreetly.

For example, this has sometimes been achieved as easily as a team getting on the radio to the slower driver and pointing out that his teammate is quicker. The slower driver then lets the quicker driver through without the need for an overt "directive" from the team. This happened, for example, at the 2010 German Grand Prix, Felipe Massa's race engineer Rob Smedley was heard to say to his driver "Fernando (Alonso) is faster than you. Can you confirm you understand that message?". Moments later, Massa eased back and allowed Alonso past.

Crashgate

Perhaps the most controversial use of team orders, occurring during the period where team orders were explicitly banned, was the 2008 Singapore Grand Prix, where the Renault F1 team used team orders to cause Nelson Piquet Jr. to crash deliberately on the fourteenth lap of the race in order to bring out the safety car, allowing his team-mate Alonso (who was proven to know nothing about the scheme) to win the race. Subsequent investigation the following year resulted in Renault receiving a two-year suspended disqualification (expired in 2011) and Flavio Briatore and Pat Symonds, two major figures involved with the team, being banned from the sport, although this was later appealed and reversed under a settlement that forbade them from working in any FIA-sanctioned events for a time.

Ban repealed
At the end of the 2010 season, the FIA conceded that the team orders rule was not working and needed to be reviewed. As of 2011, the team orders rule no longer appeared in the sporting regulations.

At the 2012 United States Grand Prix, Ferrari broke the FIA seal on the gearbox of Felipe Massa's car in order to trigger a 5-place grid penalty. This moved him behind Fernando Alonso and shifted both cars onto the "clean" side of the race track, to ensure Alonso the fastest start possible on the slippery asphalt of the brand-new Circuit of the Americas.

At the 2013 Malaysian Grand Prix, Red Bull Racing driver Sebastian Vettel was criticised for passing his team-mate Mark Webber to win the race against "Multi 21", an order from his team to hold position.

At the 2017 Hungarian Grand Prix, the Mercedes team ordered Valtteri Bottas to yield his third position for Lewis Hamilton, who had a better chance to attack second-placed Kimi Räikkönen. When it was clear that Hamilton was not able to overcome Räikkönen, Hamilton gave back the position to Bottas in the last corner of the race, costing him three points in the Drivers' Championship. Those three points did not matter in the end, as Hamilton won the title by 46 points.

At the 2018 German Grand Prix, after Vettel crashed and brought out the safety car, Hamilton inherited the lead, with team-mate Bottas behind him on fresher tyres. When the safety car period ended, Bottas initially attacked Hamilton for the lead, before being told by Mercedes' team strategist James Vowles to hold his position, handing Hamilton the win. Bottas continued to play second fiddle to Hamilton at the 2018 Russian Grand Prix, where he qualified on pole and subsequently led the race until being ordered to yield the lead to his teammate, who was ahead in the Drivers' Championship.

At the 2019 Australian Grand Prix, Ferrari ordered Charles Leclerc to hold position after he attempted to overtake team-mate Vettel. Two races later, at the Chinese Grand Prix, Leclerc was ordered by Ferrari team principal Mattia Binotto to let Vettel pass him. Binotto later said the team made the “right choice” by making the call, as Vettel finished on the podium in third whilst Leclerc finished fifth.

At the 2022 Spanish Grand Prix, Red Bull ordered Sergio Pérez to give up his lead to his teammate Max Verstappen. Pérez stated that he was happy with the team but at the same time he demanded an explanation from the team regarding the team orders given to him. Red Bull would again be accused of using team orders during the 2022 Azerbaijan Grand Prix with the team radio telling Pérez not to fight his teammate Verstappen in the main straight, however Red Bull team principal Christian Horner denied the accusation of giving team orders and Pérez defended the team decision as he experienced tyre degradation in the main straight (where Verstappen had crashed out the previous year due to a tyre failure) while some speculated the order was given to avoid another 2018 Azerbaijan Grand Prix incident (where Verstappen and then-teammate Daniel Ricciardo collided entering turn 1). Later, in the 2022 São Paulo Grand Prix, Max Verstappen controversially refused to obey team order to let his teammate Sergio Pérez pass. With Pérez falling down the order after the second safety car restart, his Red Bull Racing teammate, Verstappen, was given permission to pass him in order to overtake Fernando Alonso's Alpine. After failing to overtake Alonso, Verstappen was told by his engineer, Gianpiero Lambiase, to give the position back to Pérez, to assist Pérez in taking second in the Drivers' Championship. Verstappen refused to comply with team orders and told Lambiase not to ask him to do such a thing again, stating that he had his "reasons" to defy such orders, and that he had discussed those reasons with the team before.

Team orders in NASCAR 
In NASCAR, team orders occurs not only between drivers who drive for the same team, but also between drivers who drive for teams who happen to have the same manufacturer as the other involved parties. This form of team orders is called manufacturer orders.

2013 Federated Auto Parts 400 
Team orders became a serious issue during the 2013 Federated Auto Parts 400 on 7 September 2013, when an elaborate scheme involving the last race of the regular season before the Chase for the Sprint Cup erupted, causing officials to make serious rule changes.

With five teams involved in the race for the final two regular and both wild card slots -- Richard Childress Racing satellite Furniture Row Racing, Hendrick Motorsports and its respective satellite Stewart-Haas Racing, Michael Waltrip Racing, and Penske Racing—for the ten-race playoff, an elaborate scheme erupted in the waning stages of the race.

Ryan Newman (Stewart-Haas) was leading the race with less than ten laps remaining, and the standings had Kurt Busch (Furniture Row) in ninth, Jeff Gordon (Hendrick) in tenth by two points, with the two wild cards being Kasey Kahne (Hendrick) and Newman, both of which would have two race wins.  This would shut out Joey Logano (Penske), who was in the top ten prior to the race but struggling and now trailing Gordon by two points, and Martin Truex Jr. (Michael Waltrip), who also has one win.

Logano, down two laps, talked with fellow Ford team Front Row Motorsports driver David Gilliland about allowing Logano to pass him to gain points, as he was two points behind Gordon for tenth place in the points.  With Newman leading, Logano had to be in tenth or Logano would be out of a Chase position. Truex's teammate Clint Bowyer intentionally spun and caused a caution in an effort to assist his teammate.  Ensuing pit stops knocked Newman to third. Logano, who was two laps behind, did not pit and was able to advance ahead one lap as the leader must be the first car on the restart.

In order to allow the team orders for Michael Waltrip Racing to succeed, the elaborate scheme, which was independent of each other, took place. Bowyer pitted after the restart to go down laps in order to allow Logano to have one point, and teammate Brian Vickers did the same thing, and go very slow in the final lap, possibly below NASCAR's minimum speed requirement. This would allow Logano to pass Gordon, who without a win loses a tiebreaker to Logano. Logano then passes Gilliland. Truex races hard and ties Newman, tying Newman on the first count (most wins, one), and the second count (points), winning the third count (most second-place finishes).

Immediately after the race, the ESPN television broadcast aired Bowyer's radio transmission in the laps leading to the safety car situation, before signing off the broadcast. This led to an immediate investigation where NASCAR uncovered via team radios the complex team orders scheme, suspending Michael Waltrip Racing officials, stripping Truex of his playoff position, a $100,000 fine per car on the team, and a 50-point penalty each on all three teams (driver and owner except the #55 of Vickers, a Nationwide Series driver ineligible for Sprint Cup points, which was penalised as owner only). Probations were assessed on Front Row and Penske teams after NASCAR uncovered the radio chatter for that team orders scheme. Gordon and Newman were each reinstated to the twelve-car playoff, which increased to thirteen after Gordon was added.

A complex series of rules were announced on 14 September 2013 by NASCAR to prevent such team orders from taking place. Among the rules to prevent team orders include different teams on the spotter's stand brokering deals in exchange for the concession of a position, private team communication that cannot be detected by officials on digital radios (teams must use analog channels that can be accessed by spectators at the circuit, audio and visual media broadcasts, and officials - in previous years some teams had scrambled signals), and a limit of one spotter per spotter's stand at the circuit. At circuits where there are multiple spotters' stands used (mainly the road courses and Talladega Superspeedway), the rule will only limit one spotter to being in each post (there are often multiple posts at road courses and Talladega because it is impossible for the entire track to be seen by one spotter). NASCAR will also mandate a video camera on the stand, which will observe radio chatter among spotters (networks may also install a camera on the spotter's stand for broadcast positioning).

NASCAR also added Section 12, Rule 4, Article L in the NASCAR rule book, with the rule indirectly referencing a ban on team orders.

2019 Ford EcoBoost 400
Team orders would also play a role in another controversy at the season-ending 2019 Ford EcoBoost 400 on 17 November 2019 amongst smaller teams without active Race Team Alliance charters, Premium Motorsports and Rick Ware Racing; the scheme also involved a small chartered team in Spire Motorsports.

The incident occurred as Premium Motorsports' No. 27 car (driven by Ross Chastain for the race) raced for the top-placed non-chartered team against Gaunt Brothers Racing's No. 96 (driven by Drew Herring); the top-placed non-chartered team (referred as Open teams by NASCAR) in the owner's points standings would earn higher bonuses. NASCAR's investigation, which involved access to team radio channels, was published on 27 November 2019, which revealed that the Nos. 27, 52 (Rick Ware Racing, driven by Josh Bilicki), 77 (Spire Motorsports, driven by Reed Sorenson) and 15 (Premium Motorsports, driven by Joe Nemechek) were found to have manipulated the outcome of the race, by means of inter-team exchanges asking the latter three cars to park (retire) out of the race within a 15-lap span for the benefit of No. 27 in the point standings.

NASCAR subsequently fined crew members Scott Egglestone (Premium Motorsports) and Kenneth Evans (Rick Ware Racing) $25,000 each and suspended both indefinitely. All three team owners were fined $50,000, and all four cars were assessed a fifty-point penalty. Spire Motorsports did not appeal their penalties, while Premium and RWR remained quiet on the incident. Sorenson, who initially repeatedly refused to pit in according to radio communications, was the only driver to have points deducted from driver's point standings, as none of the other drivers were eligible to score points in the Cup series whilst mainly participating in lower NASCAR touring series; thus, the penalties primarily affected owner's point standings.

2020 Xfinity 500
After the penultimate playoff race before the Championship 4 race, the 2020 Xfinity 500, Joe Gibbs Racing was subject of an investigation following a team order message directed to Erik Jones asking him not to pass Denny Hamlin in order to help Hamlin, who had been struggling during the late phases of the race, to advance to the Championship 4 race. NASCAR ultimately did not issue penalties for Jones' or Hamlin's team, and Hamlin ultimately advanced to the Championship 4 race, where he lost the championship to Chase Elliott.

2022 Bank of America Roval 400
At the end of 2022 Bank of America Roval 400, Cole Custer's last lap behavior, in which he slowed down into the backstretch heading into the last chicane in order to allow Chase Briscoe to pass several drivers and thus increase his points gap over Kyle Larson (who suffered from a suspension damage from a wall contact), was subject of an investigation by NASCAR, although the organization assured that the Round of 8 grid would not change as a result of the investigation. On October 11, NASCAR docked Custer 50 driver and owner points, suspended Custer's crew chief Mike Shiplett (who notified, instead of Custer's spotter, that he had a supposed flat tire) indefinitely, and fined both $100,000 each, on race manipulation charges, based on the "fullest ability" clause added after the 2013 Richmond incident. On October 27, Stewart-Haas Racing lost the appeal against Custer's penalties.

Team orders in MotoGP

While not commonly used, the team orders in MotoGP has gained some notoriety in MotoGP lately for last few seasons. During the 2020 season, Suzuki was said to be playing team orders with their riders in order for Joan Mir to secure the 2020 championship. In 2022 season, Ducati was accused by rival teams of playing team orders to manipulate the championship during the San Marino, Malaysia and Valencia rounds of the season. However, team manager Davide Tardozzi denied using team orders in order to secure Francesco Bagnaia the championship and told the media that riders are free to race each other.

References 

Motorsport terminology
Auto racing controversies